The 1947 Melbourne Cup was a two-mile handicap horse race which took place on Tuesday, 4 November 1947.

The full field and placings were:

See also

 Melbourne Cup
 List of Melbourne Cup winners
 Victoria Racing Club

References

External links
1947 Melbourne Cup Field footyjumpers.com

1947
Melbourne Cup
Melbourne Cup
20th century in Melbourne
1940s in Melbourne